Nährenbach is a small river of Lower Saxony, Germany. It flows into the Weser near Fischbeck.

See also
List of rivers of Lower Saxony

References 

Rivers of Lower Saxony
Rivers of Germany